Rugby Club Județean Farul Constanța was a semi-professional Romanian rugby union club from Constanța, which played continuously from 1970 until 2014 in the CEC Bank SuperLiga, the first division of Romanian rugby. The team withdrew from the Romanian top-tier competition before the 2015 edition and ultimately disbanded.

Farul Constanța was recognized by many Romanian fans as one of the best Romanian clubs outside Bucureşti as not only did they achieve consistent results by finishing within the top 4 in the SuperLiga almost every year, they were also the first and only Romanian team to play in the then known Heineken Cup (known as the European Rugby Champions Cup now), during its inaugural season in 1995–96, notably playing in the first ever match of the Heineken Cup against Stade Toulousain in Constanța.

Honours

SuperLiga CEC Bank:
Winners (6): 1974–75, 1975–76, 1977–78, 1985–86, 1994–95, 1996–97
Runners-up (1): 2014
Cupa României:
Winners (1): 1992
Runners-up (2): 2001, 2009

Notable former players

  Malakai Ravulo 
  Nemia Kenatale 
  Jonetani Ralulu 
  Daniel Crichton
  Vlad Badalicescu
  Nicolae Nere 
  Petru Tamba 
  Otar Turashvili 
  Cristian Petre
  Constantin Gheară
  Ionel Cazan
  Florin Vlaicu 
  Adrian Apostol
  Alexandru Zaharia
  Eugene Jantjies
  Renaud van Neel

External links
 Facebook Page
 Federația de Rugby Romănia
 Romanian Rugby News
 PlanetaOvala.ro - Other Romanian Rugby News

Sport in Constanța
Rugby clubs established in 1955
Romanian rugby union teams
1955 establishments in Romania